Jan Ahmadi (also Romanized as Jān Aḩmadī; also known as Kalāteh-ye Ḩājjī Qanbar) is a village in Milanlu Rural District, in the Central District of Esfarayen County, North Khorasan Province, Iran. At the 2006 census, its population was 61, in 11 families.

References 

Populated places in Esfarayen County